Peter Rafferty is a retired Northern Irish footballer who played in the Irish League with Distillery, Linfield, Ards and Crusaders in the 1960s, 1970s and 1980s. He won 1 international cap for Northern Ireland. He also won two caps for the Irish League representative team.

He made his Irish League debut in April 1967 for Distillery as a centre-forward, but established himself the following season as a centre-half. He won an Irish Cup winners' medal with the Whites in 1971. In total he made 262 appearances for Distillery, turning out in every position including goalkeeper, before he was signed by Linfield in December 1973.

Nicknamed the "Bald Eagle" by the Linfield supporters, he made 331 appearances in nine seasons for the Blues, winning five Irish League titles, three Irish Cups, one City Cup, two Gold Cups, four Ulster Cups, three County Antrim Shields and 1 Tyler Cup. He was the Ulster Footballer of the Year for 1976–77.

He finished his career with a season at Ards and two at Crusaders.

Sources
 M. Brodie (ed.), Northern Ireland Soccer Yearbook 2009-2010, p. 102. Belfast:Ulster Tatler Publications
Northern Ireland's Footballing Greats

Association footballers from Northern Ireland
NIFL Premiership players
Ulster Footballers of the Year
Lisburn Distillery F.C. players
Linfield F.C. players
Ards F.C. players
Crusaders F.C. players
Living people
1948 births
Northern Ireland international footballers
Irish League representative players
Association football defenders